Yoo Sang-yeol (10 September 1940 – 14 February 2022) was a South Korean public official. He died on 14 February 2022, at the age of 81.

References

1940 births
2022 deaths
South Korean government officials
South Korean businesspeople
Kyunggi High School alumni
Seoul National University alumni
Seoul National University School of Law alumni
Republic of Korea Air Force personnel
People from Cheongju